Tutankhamun was an Egyptian pharaoh of the 18th dynasty.

Tutankhamun may also refer to:
Tutankhamun (album), a 1969 album by the Art Ensemble of Chicago
Tutankhamun (TV series), a 2016 adventure-drama serial

See also 
 Exhibitions of artifacts from the tomb of Tutankhamun
 Tutankhamun and the Daughter of Ra, a 1989 novel by Moyra Caldecott